Anna Sophie Linde Okkels (born 23 March 1990) is a former Danish handball, who laste played for Silkeborg-Voel KFUM and the Danish national team until 2017.

She participated at the 2015 World Women's Handball Championship.

References

1990 births
Living people
Danish female handball players
Sportspeople from Aarhus